Nicholas B. Nemmers (March 15, 1852 - February 3, 1923) was a teacher, merchant, public official and legislator from La Motte, Iowa.

Background 
Nemmers was born in St. Donatus in Jackson County, Iowa on March 15, 1852. He attended the local public schools, and attended Pio Nono College, a Catholic men's normal school outside Milwaukee, graduating in 1874. He taught school in Jackson County until 1882, when he became a merchant in La Motte, which remained his primary occupation until his death. On July 5, 1876 he married Elizabeth Manders of St. Donatus; they would have eleven children together.

Public office 
Nemmers served many years as postmaster of La Motte and also held the office of mayor, councilman, school director, tax assessor, etc. In 1889 he was elected as a Democratic member of the Iowa House of Representatives; he was re-elected in 1891.

He died February 3, 1923.

References 

1852 births
1923 deaths
Educators from Iowa
Democratic Party members of the Iowa House of Representatives
Mayors of places in Iowa
School board members in Iowa
Iowa city council members